Sarah Ardizzone (née Adams) is a literary translator, working from French to English. She has won the Marsh Award for Children's Literature in Translation two times (2005 and 2009), and the Scott-Moncrieff Prize once in 2007.

Career 
Ardizzone has translated some 40 titles by writers such as Daniel Pennac, Yasmina Reza and Alexandre Dumas. She specialises in translating sharp dialogue, urban and migrant slang – ‘a world literature in French'. Sarah also curates educational programmes – including Translation Nation, Translators in Schools and the Spectacular Translation Machine – and is a patron of children's world literature charity Outside In World.

Translations 
Small Country, by Gaël Faye 
The Little Prince (Joann Sfar's graphic novel version) – was a New York Times Notable Book of 2010
Toby Alone, by Timothée de Fombelle – won the Marsh Award for Children's Literature in Translation 2009
Just Like Tomorrow, by Faïza Guène – won the Scott-Moncrieff Prize 2007; shortlisted for the Marsh Award for Children's Literature in Translation 2007
Eye of the Wolf, by Daniel Pennac – won the Marsh Award for Children's Literature in Translation 2005
Kamo's Escape by Daniel Pennac – shortlisted for the Marsh Award for Children's Literature in Translation 2005
School Blues, by Daniel Pennac 
The Rights of the Reader, by Daniel Pennac
Bar Balto, by Faïza Guène

Prizes and awards 
 Shortlisted for 2019 Albertine Prize for Small Country
New York Times Notable Book of 2010 for The Little Prince (Joann Sfar's graphic novel version)
 Winner of the Marsh Award for Children's Literature in Translation in 2009 for Toby Alone, by Timothée de Fombelle
 Winner of the Scott-Moncrieff Prize in 2007 for Just Like Tomorrow by Faïza Guène 
 Shortlisted for the Marsh Award for Children's Literature in Translation in 2007
 Winner of the Marsh Award for Children's Literature in Translation in 2005 for Eye of the Wolf, by Daniel Pennac

References

External links 
 Sarah Ardizzone on WorldCat
 Sarah Ardizzone on Translators in Schools

French–English translators
Living people
Literary translators
Winners of the Marsh Award for Children's Literature in Translation
Year of birth missing (living people)
English translators
21st-century British translators